Devil's Disciple may refer to:

 The Devil's Disciple (play), an 1897 play by George Bernard Shaw
 The Devil's Disciple (1959 film), adaptation directed by Guy Hamilton
 The Devil's Disciple (1987 film), adaptation directed by David Jones
 The Devil's Disciple (1926 film), a silent film on white slavery, written and directed by Oscar Micheaux
 Devil's Disciples, a 2007 television series from Hong Kong
 Devils Diciples (sic), an American outlaw motorcycle club
 Devil's Disciples Motorcycle Club (Canada), a now-defunct French-Canadian outlaw motorcycle club
 Devils Disciples Motorcycle Club (Ireland), an active outlaw motorcycle club in the Republic of Ireland